Estonia competed at the 1924 Summer Olympics in Paris, France.

Medalists

The 1924 Estonian Olympic Team
 Representatives 
Estonian team representatives were delegation heads Leopold Tõnson and Johannes Junkur; Johannes Kauba in athletics, Johannes Villemson in wrestling, William Fiskar and Aleksander Lugenberg-Mändvere in football.
 Other delegations
Estonians in other delegations were for  Juhan Oja in athletics – men's 100 and 200 metres and Rudolf Rone (lv: Rūdolfs Ronis) in wrestling – men's Greco-Roman lightweight.

Results by event

Athletics
Men's 100 metres
 Reinhold Kesküll – Round 1 Heat 13: 5th 11,5 (→ dnq )
 Herbert Küttim – Round 1 Heat 1: (→ dns)
 Juhan Oja – competed for  – Round 1 Heat 5: 2nd 11,2; Round 2 Heat 3: 5th 11,2 (→ dnq )
Men's 200 metres
 Reinhold Kesküll – Round 1 Heat 16: 3rd 24,0 (→ dnq )
 Herbert Küttim – Round 1 Heat 7: (→ dns)
 Juhan Oja – competed for  – Round 1 Heat 17: 2nd 23,8; Round 2 Heat 1: 4th 23,1 (→ dnq )
Men's 400 metres
 Reinhold Kesküll – Round 1 Heat 2: 4th 53,2 (→ dnq )
 Herbert Küttim – Round 1 Heat 3: (→ dns)
Men's 800 metres
 Johannes Villemson – Round 1 Heat 8: (→ dns)
Men's 1500 metres
 Aleksander Antson – Round 1 Heat 5: 5th (→ dnq )
 Johannes Villemson – Round 1 Heat 2: (→ dns)
Men's marathon
 Jüri Lossman – Final –: 2:57.54,6 (→ 10. place)
 Elmar Reiman – Final –   3:40.52,0 (→ finished last, 30. place)
Men's 3000 metre steeplechase
 Aleksander Antson – Round 1 Heat 1: (→ dns)
Men's high jump
 Valter Ever – Qualification round Group 1: 1.75m (→ dns?, 15.- 18. place )
Men's long jump
 Valter Ever – Qualification round Group 1: 6th 6.585m (→ dnq, 19. place)
Men's pole vault
 Valter Ever – Qualification round Group 2: 9th–11th  3.20 (→ dnq, 15.- 20. place )
Men's shot put
 Harald Tammer – Qualification round Group 1: 5th 13.28m (→ 12. place)
Men's discus throw
 Gustav Kalkun – Qualification round Group 2: 5th  38.46m (→ 15. place)
Men's javelin throw
 Aleksander Klumberg – Qualification round Group 2: 9th  49.61m (→ 17. place);
Men's decathlon
 Aleksander Klumberg – Final: ( 100 m – 11,6s; long jump – 6,96m; shot put – 12.27m; high jump – 1,75m; 400 m – 54,4s; 100 m hurdles – 17,6s; discus throw – 36.795m; pole vault – 3.30m; javelin throw – 57.70m; 1,500 m – 5.16,0 ) Total points: 7329,360p. (→  Bronze Medal)
 Eugen Neumann – Final: ( 100 m – 11,8; long jump – 6.49m; shot put – 9.63m; high jump – 1.65m; 400 m – 55,4s; 100 m hurdles – 17,0s; discus throw – 28.46m; pole vault – 3.30m; javelin throw – 40.69; 1,500 m – 5.32,4 ) Total points: 5899,105p (→ 16. place)
 Elmar Rähn – Final: ( 100 m – 11,8s; long jump – 6.27m; shot put – 9.525m; high jump – 1.60m; 400 m – 53,6s; 100 m hurdles – 18,4s; discus throw – dnf; pole vault – 2.80m; javelin throw – 38.38m; 1,500 m – 4.44,0 ) Total points: 5292,760p (→ 21. place)
 Valter Ever – Final: ( 100 m – 11,8; long jump – 6.45m; shot put – 10.90m; high jump – 1.70m; 400 m – 55,8s) (→ dnf, 32. place)

Boxing
Men's welterweight (−66,7 kg).
 Valter Palm 
 First round – lost to Héctor Méndez  (→ did not advance, 17.-29. place)

Weightlifting
Men's featherweight (−60,0 kg)
 Aleksander Richmann (→ dns)
 Gustav Ernesaks 372,5 kg (60,0; 80,0; 67,5; 72,5; 92,5 ) (→ 6. place) 
Men's lightweight (−67,5 kg)
 Eduard Vanaaseme 415,0 kg (65,5; 77,5; 85,0; 80,0; 107,5 ) (→ 6. place)
 Voldemar Noormägi 295,0 kg (65,5; 75,0; 85,0; 72,5; 0 ) (→ 22. place) 
Men's middleweight (−75,0 kg)
 Alfred Neuland 455,0 kg (82,5; 90,0; 77,5; 90,0; 115,0 ) .(→  Silver Medal)
 Jaan Kikkas 450,0 kg (70,0; 87,5; 80,0; 85,0;127,5 ).(→  Bronze Medal)
Men's light-heavyweight (−82,5 kg)
 Saul Hallap 465,0 kg (75,0; 95,0; 90,0; 90,0; 115,0 ) (→ 9. place)
Men's heavyweight (+82,5 kg)
 Harald Tammer 497,5 kg (75,0; 95,0; 90,0; 97,5; 140,0 ).(→  Bronze Medal)
 Kalju Raag 490,0 kg (80,0; 92,5; 90,0; 97,5; 130,0 ) (→ 7. place)

Wrestling
Men's Greco-Roman Bantamweight (−58 kg)
 Eduard Pütsep 
 First round – defeated P. Slock  by fall 4 min.
 Second round – defeated Väinö V. Ikonen  with points.
 Third round – defeated J. Skopový  with points.
 Fourth round – defeated Anselm Ahlfors  by fall 16 min. 
 Fifth round – defeated Armand Magyar  with points.
 Sixth round – defeated Sigfrid Hansson  with points. (→  Gold Medal)
 Anton Koolmann 
 First round – defeated Georges Appruzeze  by fall 13min 10s.
 Second round – lost to Giovanni Gozzi  with points.
 Third round – lost to Väinö V. Ikonen  with points. (→ did not advance, 13.-16. place)

Men's Greco-Roman Featherweight (−62 kg)
 Voldemar Väli  
 First round – defeated Eduard Rottiers  with points.
 Second round – defeated Jordán Vallmajo Giralt  by fall 3m 45s.
 Third round – lost to Arthur Nord  with points.
 Fourth round – lost to Ödön Radvány  with points. (→ did not advance, 8.-11. place)
 Osvald Käpp  
 First round – defeated René Rottenfluc  by fall 16m 12s.
 Second round – defeated Jenö Németh  with points.
 Third round – lost to Aage Torgensen  with points.
 Fourth round – lost to Kalle Anttila  with points. (→ did not advance, 8.-11. place)

Men's Greco-Roman Lightweight (−67,5 kg)
 Albert Kusnets  
 First round – defeated G. Metayer  by fall 12 min 20s.
 Second round – defeated Otto Borgström  by fall 1 min 20s.
 Third round – defeated Walter Ranghieri  by fall 0min 00s.
 Fourth round – defeated Mihály Matura  with points. 
 Fifth round – defeated Arne Gaupseth  with points.
 Sixth round – lost to Kalle Westerlund  with points. (→ 4. place)
 Alfred Praks  
 First round – defeated Holger Askehave  with points.
 Second round – defeated Leon Rękawek  by fall 2 min 30s.
 Third round – lost to Rūdolfs Ronis (Rudolf Rone)  with points 26min.
 Fourth round – lost to Kalle Westerlund  with points. (→ did not advance, 10.-12. place)

Men's Greco-Roman Middleweight (−75,0 kg)
 Roman Steinberg  
 First round – defeated Ferenc Györgyei (A. Györffy)  with points. 
 Second round – free.
 Third round – defeated F. Pražky  by fall 19min 45s.
 Fourth round – defeated J. Domas  with points. 
 Fifth round – lost to Giuseppe Gorletti  with points.
 Sixth round – defeated Viktor Fischer  with points. (→  Bronze Medal)

Men's Greco-Roman Light Heavyweight (−82,5 kg)
 Rudolf Loo
 First round – lost to Emil Wecksten  with points. 
 Second round – defeated Bonnefonti  by fall.
 Third round – defeated István Dömény  by fall.
 Fourth round – lost to Olli Pellinen  with points. (→ did not advance, 6. place)

Men's Freestyle Featherweight (−61 kg)
 Anton Koolmann   
 1/8 Final round – lost to Robin Reed 
 Tournament to 2nd place – First round – lost to Chester Newton . (→ did not advance, 10. place)

Men's Freestyle Lightweight (−66 kg)
 Alfred Praks   
 1/8 Final round – defeated Perry Martter  .
 1/4 Final round – lost to Arvo Haavisto . (→ did not advance, 7. place)
 Osvald Käpp 
 1/8 Final round – lost to George Gardiner  (→ did not advance, 11.-16. place)

Football
  Estonian Team: incl. reserves (J.Brenner, E. Einmann, Eduard Ellman-Eelma, V.Gerassimov, N.Javorski, Ernst Joll, Alfei Jürgenson, Harald Kaarmann, Elmar Kaljot, J.Kihlefeld, August Lass, J.Lello, Ralf Liivar, Heinrich Paal, Arnold Pihlak, H.Põder, Bernhard Rein, Voldemar Rõks, Otto Silber, Evald Tipner, Oskar Üpraus, Hugo Väli)
 1 round (May 25, 1928 ) (Stade Pershing), Bois de Vincennes, (Paris),  (7500) 
Referees : M.Putz (Belgium), Youssof Mohammed (Egypt) and G.A.Herren (Switzerland)

: August Lass, Arnold Pihlak, Otto Silber, Elmar Kaljot, Bernhard Rein, Harald Kaarmann, Hugo Väli, Heinrich Paal, Eduard Ellman-Eelma, Oskar Üpraus, Ernst Joll

: Jimmy Douglas, Irving Davis, Arthur Rudd, Franke Burke Jones, Raymond Hornberger, Fred O'Connor, William Findlay, Aage Brix, Andy Straden, Henry Farrell, Sam Dalrymple

lost to  0:1 goal by Andy Straden (United States) 10.min.(pen). (→ did not advance)

References

 EOK – Pariis 1924 

Nations at the 1924 Summer Olympics
1924
Olympics